Curren Caples (born January 10, 1996) is an American professional skateboarder. He turned pro in March 2013, and his first professional contest was the Tampa Pro, where he placed 69th.

At X Games Barcelona 2013 he won a silver medal in skateboard park. That same year he won the VQS surf contest in Kauai beating Sunrise Shack owner Koa Smith. At X Games Munich 2013, he won a platinum medal in skateboard park, beating the favorite, Pedro Barros. Caples qualified 2nd behind Barros in the skateboard park qualifying at the 2014 Austin X Games, eventually finishing 1st in the final. In the skateboard street event he was knocked out of qualifying by Ryan Sheckler, failing to reach the final six. Most recently he finished 18th at the 2019 CBDMD Peahi Championships in Maui.
Caples currently rides for Skate Mental, Ace Trucks, RVCA Clothing, Vans, Mob, Oakley, Bones Swiss Bearings, Monster Energy and Momentum Ride Shop.

References

External links 
 

American skateboarders
1996 births
Living people
People from Ventura, California
Sportspeople from California
X Games athletes
Sportspeople from Ventura County, California